Details of the 2015 All-Ireland Under-21 B Hurling Championship.

Overview

Kildare are the defending champions, having beaten Roscommon in the 2014 All-Ireland final.

Fixtures/results

Quarter-finals

Semi-finals

Final

External links
 2015 All-Ireland Under-21 B Hurling Championship fixtures and results

References

2015 in hurling